Lorenzo Milesi (born 19 March 2002) is an Italian cyclist, who currently rides for UCI Continental team . He will join UCI WorldTeam  in 2023, heaving signed a three-year contract with the team in late 2022.

Major results

2019
 2nd Time trial, National Junior Championships
2020
 1st  Time trial, National Junior Championships
 3rd  Time trial, UEC European Junior Championships
 3rd Trofeo Buffoni
2022
 Le Triptyque des Monts et Châteaux
1st  Mountains classification
1st Stages 1 & 3a (ITT)
 1st Stage 9 Tour de l'Avenir
 7th Time trial, UEC European Under-23 Championships
 10th Time trial, UCI World Under-23 Championships

References

External links

2002 births
Living people
Italian male cyclists